The Railway Enthusiasts Society Incorporated (known by its acronym RES) is a New Zealand railway enthusiast society formed on 17 July 1958. RES formed the Glenbrook Vintage Railway (GVR) in 1968, with GVR now forming a separate charitable trust.

Objectives

The RES objectives are as follows:

 To foster an intelligent interest in railways and in their operation and development generally.
 To facilitate the exchange between railway enthusiasts of information concerning the history, development, design, construction and operation of railways in New Zealand and elsewhere.
 To encourage the preservation of private and public collections of railway photographs, films, literature and equipment.
 To publish, print, distribute and authorise periodicals, books, magazines and other printed matter on topics of railway interest or related to the Society's activities.
 To arrange trips, tours and excursions to places of railway or general interest.

The Railway Enthusiasts Society incorporates the Glenbrook Vintage Railway.

Excursions and tours

1960s
Over the years since its formation, the Society has grown its reputation, both within the rail industry and publicly, by operating excursions to places of interest, both railway related and non-railway related.

The earliest excursions saw extra carriages attached to regular passenger train services throughout both the North Island and South Island. The Society has also operated its own private charter train services for larger trips, an activity it still does to this day.

Some excursions have achieved legendary status, particularly by the rail heritage sector. Many members remember earlier trips such as the 19th century tank locomotive "Meg Merriles" (a member of the F class) running trips to Swanson and Drury, C class locomotives double-heading services to Meremere and the mid-winter trips down the North Island Main Trunk.

Probably the most memorable excursion of this period was three 4-8-2 JA class locomotives triple-heading an 18 carriage train from Auckland to Hamilton in 1964 – a feat which, to date, has not been repeated on New Zealand's national rail network with steam traction. The Society replicated this operation with classic 1950s DA class diesel locomotives (the specific class members were 1410, 1429 and 1431), on the Auckland – Mt Maunganui "Seatrain" 2000 trip and Auckland – Whangarei "Waves & Wheels" trip in 2001.

In the late 1960s and early 1970s, the end of steam traction provided the opportunity to run locomotives from their bases at the time, to Auckland, for preservation as part of the Society's Glenbrook Vintage Railway project.

In 1969 small WW class locomotive 480 ran a rail tour the length of the Midland Line from Greymouth to Christchurch, then up the Main North Line from Christchurch to Picton, before crossing the Cook Strait and up the North Island Main Trunk from Wellington to Auckland. The response from the public was phenomenal, with most vantage points packed with people, either on foot or in cars, who had come out to see the train travel north. The journey was also the subject of a National Film Unit film "The Ride of 480". The 1920s locomotive was special to the Society because whilst based in the Auckland (until about 1964), the engine had been used on many Society excursions around the Auckland area and was a favourite with many of the members who also worked on NZR at the time.

The whole project was repeated the following year when sister WW class locomotive 644 ran the same journey from Greymouth to Auckland over the same timeframe.

1970s
In 1972, JA locomotive "Diana" was brought to Auckland via the Wairarapa and Taranaki regions with sister locomotive J 1236. On the last leg of the trip from Auckland to the Glenbrook Vintage Railway, the train was fully booked and all vantage points along the route were also filled with people. It would turn out that this would be the last steam train to carry passengers out of Auckland City until 1985.

In 1976, due to a shortage of available carriages, NZR announced it would no longer make carriages available to organisations for charter work. The Society responded to the situation by assisting the formation of the National Federation of Rail Societies (later renamed Federation of Rail Organisations of New Zealand), a national body to look after the interests of all rail heritage organisations in New Zealand.

The Federation successfully negotiated for private (non motive power) rolling stock to operate on the national rail network. In 1978, an excursion from Auckland to Tauranga through the recently opened Kaimai Tunnel, operated with three Society carriages and one carriage hired from Steam Incorporated.

1980s
In 1981 and 1986, the Society operated steam-hauled trains with Glenbrook Vintage Railway's Mallet locomotive and WW 480 along Quay Street in Auckland as part of tourism promotions. These lines, which served Port of Auckland wharves, were removed in the late 1980s and the trains were the last to carry passengers in Auckland's Central Business District until the opening of Britomart Transport Centre in July 2003.

In 1985, permission was granted by NZR to the National Federation to operate motive power rolling stock (including steam power) on the NZR network. In co-operating with Steam Incorporated, the Society ran a special Auckland-Wellington and return rail tour the length of the North Island Main Trunk pulled by JA 1250 "Diana" and KA 945.

In 1988, the Society was involved in the Ferrymead 125 celebrations in Christchurch that commemorated 125 years since the first steam drawn railway operated in New Zealand. The Society ran a rail tour from Auckland to Christchurch and return with its own excursion carriages, hauled by JA 1250. Once in Christchurch, the trainset was used on numerous excursions associated with the events, including a run from Christchurch to Timaru return and Christchurch to Arthur's Pass and return. These latter trips also consisted of Otago Excursion Train Trust carriages and New Zealand Railways Corporation carriages pulled by J A 1250 and J 1211 "Gloria" on its first network appearance with the then recently formed Mainline Steam Trust.

1990s
The Society continued to offer a broader range of excursions and tours throughout the 1990s despite the loss of JA 1250 from service for a major overhaul.

A major feat through the decade was the operation of the Silver Fern railcar on almost every line it could operate on in the North Island including the Taneatua Branch, Murupara Branch, Kinleith Branch, Cambridge Branch, Rotowaro Branch, Mission Bush Branch, Onehunga Branch, North Auckland Line to Otiria, Stratford–Okahukura Line, Waitara Branch, Kapuni Branch, Wanganui Branch and the Wairarapa Line.

In 1991, the Society operated a European and British Rail tour, organised by John Stitchbury.

At Labour Weekend 1993, the Society operated the last steam-powered train rides on the Onehunga Branch for some time, which were operated with WW 480 – significant as the same engine had operated one of the Society's earliest excursions to Onehunga in 1962. (In 2010, steam returned to Onehunga during an open day before commuter services commenced, this time using Mainline Steam's JA 1275.)

In 1994, Silver Stream Railway's C 847 was steamed at Glenbrook Vintage Railway for the first time since retiring from NZR service. In early October, it became certified for operations on mainline rails, operating the "Western Leader Flyer" between Avondale and Waitakere in coordination with Henderson's 150th celebrations. The following day the locomotive double-headed with WW 480 to Huntly on an excursion. During the return journey, the train was split in half and each locomotive pulled half the train side by side between Mercer and Pukekohe, the only time in New Zealand history that two steam-powered trains have operated in this manner.

In 1995, a South Island rail tour visited all the railway lines available to passenger charter as were possible. Included in the itinerary was haulage in the North Island by a small DH class heavy shunting engine between Auckland and Hamilton, EF class between Hamilton and Palmerston North, and preserved DA 1471 between Palmerston North and Wellington southbound. In the South Island preserved DE508 pulled the train down the Main North Line from Picton to Christchurch and the last DJ class locomotive owned by New Zealand Rail, DJ3096, was employed on the rest of the South Island itinerary. The operation of the train to Hokitika empty for photos, down the Bluff Branch to the Bluff Harbour Island and along the Lyttelton Line to Lyttelton Port were rare and unusual. So too was the final segment of the run from Hamilton to Pukekohe, where C No. 47 (on a return day excursion between Auckland and Hamilton) double-headed the train with DA 1471 that had returned the tour from Wellington to Auckland via the Wairarapa and Taranaki. The tour did not only cater to rail enthusiasts but featured visits to sightseeing attractions at every stop along the way (including a non-rail side trip to Stewart Island/Rakiura).

In 1998, with C 847 returning to its home base in the Hutt Valley, and JA 1250 not quite ready to re-enter service, the Society entered an agreement with Steam Incorporated to hire J 1234. This engine pulled a number of excursions around the upper North Island until JA 1250 returned to network service in 1999. J 1234 has also been used on Glenbrook Vintage Railway services, particularly on the popular Thomas Weekends where it carries the title "Wally the Wellington Engine".

Also in 1998, the Society hired two members of the DA class from Steam Incorporated, DA 1410 and DA 1431, for excursion service. These have been used on a large number of excursions to destinations including Rotorua, Taumarunui, Helensville and Kaipara Flats.

Current excursions and tours
In recent years the Society has continued to increase its membership and trips and tours profile. Two particular excursions are widely popular and book out weeks in advance every year. Waves & Wheels takes passengers from Auckland to the Bay of Islands and return completing various sectors of travel by rail, coach and Fullers Ferries catamaran. Seatrain offers a similar experience, operating between Auckland and Mount Maunganui.

Other regular trips have included the "Snowball Express" from Auckland to Ohakune and Mount Ruapehu by Silver Fern railcar, "Rally Spectators Special" from Auckland to Northland for an exclusive viewing of the Rally of New Zealand, "Fieldays by Fern" to the National Agricultural Fieldays by Silver Fern railcar, and various extended tours giving thorough coverage of both the North and South Islands.

The Whangamomona Republic Day trains are popular, with trains from Auckland, Hamilton and Palmerston North carrying thousands of passengers to the festivities. The fifteen carriage train operated for the 2005 event was featured in Marcus Lush's "Off the Rails" television series.

The Society has also operated short one-hour rides around the circuit formed by Auckland's Auckland–Newmarket Line, North Island Main Trunk Railway and North Auckland Line, usually pulled by JA 1250.

Overseas Tours are open to Society member's only and have included recent visits to Canada and the northern states of the US, recent visits to almost all the states in Australia and the most recent visit to Great Britain.

Club meeting nights and social events
A number of social events are also held for members of the Society throughout the year. On the second Tuesday of each month (except January), members meet at the Pearce Street Hall, Onehunga for an interesting and informative presentation and discussion on historic items and more contemporary topics that affect the rail industry in New Zealand and abroad. Topics also frequently cover highlights of society events, both past and present and offer members to meet with one another during the social supper at the conclusion of the program.

Occasionally events are held for members at the Glenbrook Vintage Railway. "Railfan's Days" are member-only days where trains re-creating the past are assembled and operated for those who want to ride and photograph them. Often items in the Glenbrook Vintage Railway fleet that are not seen on public operating days are brought out and operated for the benefit of Society members. These items include members of the classic diesel fleet, the steam crane and freight wagons.

An annual tradition has been the "Midnight Whistle", an evening function on 31 December of each year where members enjoy an evening meal and rare dusk and night time steam train rides. The site when everybody disembarks in a lineside field and the train reverses, prior to roaring past is memorable in itself. A lengthy blast on the whistle echoes around the local farms to signal in the New Year.

The Society is registered under the Incorporated Societies Act 1908 and its Annual General Meeting is usually held in September and covers reports on activities of the society, annual election of all officers and committee members (incumbents, by the Society's constitution, must stand down at the beginning of the meeting) and discussions on future activities.

Museum and office

The Society's registered office is located at 38 Alfred Street, Onehunga, Auckland. Open Monday to Saturday, between 9:00 am and 12:00 pm, it is completely staffed by volunteer members of the Society.

The office, not only takes excursion bookings, sells publications and answers all phone calls in relation to society and Glenbrook Vintage Railway activities, but also is the location where the Society's elected committee meets and Glenbrook Vintage Railway Charitable Trusboard and Branch meetings are held. It is thus, a very important piece of infrastructure for both entities.

The building was built in 1873 and was originally sited on the corner of Princess St and Onehunga Mall, Onehunga, beside the Onehunga Branch. The tight curve at this point on the line resulted in the station platform having an irregular triangle shape. In 1964, the building was put up for sale and the society purchased it and moved it to the block of land it presently occupies – land designated for the future Avondale–Southdown Line. It is believed to be the oldest railway station building in the country. An F class locomotive, F 233, was displayed at the Office site until 1984 when it was moved to the Glenbrook Vintage Railway for eventual restoration.

The building has also been used for a number of social events such as the Society's 30th and 40th birthday party (with accompanied rail excursion from Auckland City on both occasions), fundraising meals (in the lead up to Glenbrook Vintage Railway's opening) and smaller members meetings and overseas tour information meetings.

The Railway Enthusiasts Society operates a museum out of the old Onehunga Railway Station, which includes a selection of railway photos, memorabilia and railway artefacts. The museum also houses the collectible New Zealand Railways cups, which can fetch over $100 each.

Also included in the collection are also a huge number of magazines the Society receives on its members' behalf, operating electric tablet machines, locomotive and carriage brass number plates, three locomotive headlines (BB), JA and K. One of the more distinctive items, not actually on display but still in operating capacity is the 19th century light bulb which illuminates the now unisex (was females) lavatory room.

Glenbrook Vintage Railway

The Glenbrook Vintage Railway is a project of the Railway Enthusiasts Society, managed by a separate Charitable Trust on behalf of the Society. The Charitable Trust was formed in 1972.

The members of the Glenbrook Vintage Railway Trust board are appointed by the Railway Enthusiasts Society committee, or in the case of the Member's Trustee, elected the Annual General Meeting of the Railway Enthusiasts Society.

Whilst the two organisations are separate entities, the majority of those who assist the Glenbrook Vintage Railway are members of the Railway Enthusiasts Society and take an active role in the Society's activities on top of assisting the Glenbrook Vintage Railway.

Notes

References

External links
 Railway Enthusiasts Society
 Railway Enthusiasts Society – Archive.org copy of old site

Heritage railways in New Zealand
Rail transport in Auckland
Railway societies